Parasarpa zayla, the bicolor commodore, is a species of nymphalid butterfly found in tropical and subtropical Asia.

Cited references

References
 
 
 
 

Limenitidinae
Fauna of Pakistan
Butterflies of Asia
Butterflies described in 1848